George Nodland (born June 1, 1945) is an American politician who served in the North Dakota Senate from the 36th district from 2008 to 2012.

References

1945 births
Living people
Republican Party North Dakota state senators